Open learning is an innovative movement in education that emerged in the 1970s and evolved into fields of practice and study. The term refers generally to activities that either enhance learning opportunities within formal education systems or broaden learning opportunities beyond formal education systems. Open learning involves but is not limited to: classroom teaching methods, approaches to interactive learning, formats in work-related education and training, the cultures and ecologies of learning communities, and the development and use of open educational resources. While there is no agreed-upon, comprehensive definition of open learning, central focus is commonly placed on the "needs of the learner as perceived by the learner." Case studies illustrate open learning as an innovation both within and across academic disciplines, professions, social sectors and national boundaries, and in business and industry, higher education institutions, collaborative initiatives between institutions, and schooling for young learners.

Inception

Open learning as a teaching method is founded on the work of Célestin Freinet in France and Maria Montessori in Italy, among others.
Open learning is supposed to allow pupils self-determined, independent and interest-guided learning. A prominent example is the language experience approach to teaching initial literacy (cf. Brügelmann/ Brinkmann 2011).
More recent work on open learning has been conducted by the German pedagogues Hans Brügelmann (1975; 1999), Falko Peschel (2002), Jörg Ramseger (1977) and Wulf Wallrabenstein (1991). The approach is supposed to face up to three challenges (cf. in more detail Brügelmann/ Brinkmann 2008, chap. 1):
 the vast differences in experiences, interests, and competencies between children of the same age;
 the constructivist nature of learning demanding active problem-solving by the learner him- and herself;
 the legal requirement of student participation in decisions stipulated by the UN Convention on the Rights of the Child (CRC). of 1989.

Current uses of the term
The term "open learning" also refers to open and free sharing of educational materials.

See also

Active learning
Alternative education
Augmented learning
Cooperative learning
Didactic method
Distance education
Experiential education
Example choice
Language Experience Approach
Learning by teaching (LdL)
Language exchange
Lifelong learning
MIT OpenCourseWare
MIT Open Learning
Open education
OpenLearning a social online learning platform for teachers to deliver courses.
Open Learning for Development an Open Training Platform sponsored by UNESCO offering free training resources on a wide range of development topics, fostering cooperation to provide free and open content for development.
Minimally invasive education, a term used in the deployment of Internet-connected computers in public places to encourage voluntary learning.
Self-regulated learning
Social learning (social pedagogy)

References

Notes

Further reading
 Brügelmann, H. (1975): Open curricula—A paradox? In: Cambridge Journal of Education, Vol. 1, No. 5, Lent Term 1975, 12-20.
 Brügelmann, H. (1999): From invention to convention. Children's different routes to literacy. How to teach reading and writing by construction vs. instruction. In: Nunes, T. (ed.) (1999): Learning to read: An integrated view from research and practice. Kluwer: Dordrecht et al., pp. 315–342.
 Brügelmann, H./ Brinkmann, E.(2008): Öffnung des Anfangsunterrichts. Theoretische Prinzipien, unterrichtspraktische Ideen und empirische Befunde. Arbeitsgruppe Primarstufe/ Universität: Siegen (2nd ed.. 2009).
 Brügelmann, H./ Brinkmann, E. (2011): Combining openness and structure in the initial literacy curriculum. A language experience approach for beginning teachers. https://web.archive.org/web/20160303224849/http://www2.agprim.uni-siegen.de/printbrue/brue.bri.language_experience.engl.111124.pdf
 Giaconia, R.M./ Hedges, L.V. (1982): Identifying features of effective open education. In: Review of Educational Research, Vol. 52, 579-602.
 Kent, Jeff (1987): Principles of Open Learning, Witan Books, .
 Peschel, F. (2002a+b): Offener Unterricht – Idee – Realität - Perspektive und ein praxiserprobtes Konzept zur Diskussion. Teil I: Allgemeindidaktische Überlegungen. Teil II: Fachdidaktische Überlegungen. Schneider Verlag Hohengehren: Baltmannsweiler.
 Peschel, F. (2003): Offener Unterricht - Idee, Realität, Perspektive und ein praxiserprobtes Konzept in der Evaluation. Dissertation. FB 2 der Universität: Siegen/ Schneider Hohengehren: Baltmannsweiler.
 Ramseger, J. (1977): Offener Unterricht in der Erprobung. Erfahrungen mit einem  didaktischen Modell. Juventa: München (3rd ed. 1992).
 Rothenberg, J. (1989): The open classroom reconsidered. In: The Elementary School Journal, Vol. 90, No. 1, 69-86.
 Silberman, C.E. (Ed.) (1973): The open classroom Reader. Vintage Books: New York.
 Wallrabenstein, W. (1991): Offene Schule – offener Unterricht. Ratgeber für Eltern und Lehrer. Rororo-Sachbuch 8752: Reinbek.

Educational practices
Teaching
Philosophy of education
Pedagogy